Paul Fried may refer to:

Paul Fried (musician), American musician, bass player for band Audiovent
Paul Fried (actor) (born 1958), Swedish actor and former writer